Marsco is a peak in the Red Hills on the Isle of Skye in Scotland. It lies on the east of Glen Sligachan, and may be climbed from the right-of-way through the glen from Sligachan to Loch Coruisk. Alternatively, it may also be reached from Coire nam Bruadaran on the western side.

Marsco has magnificent views of the main Cuillin ridge as well as out to sea; many walkers reckon it is perhaps the finest of all the Grahams.

A photograph of Marsco and Glen Sligachan, taken by Richard Nutt, features on the cover of the second album by British synthpop band Orchestral Manoeuvres in the Dark (OMD), Organisation, released in October 1980.

Scottish rock group Runrig released a song called "Nightfall on Marsco" on their 1981 album Recovery.

References

External links

Nightfall on Marsco lyrics

Grahams
Marilyns of Scotland
Mountains and hills of the Isle of Skye